Shell WindEnergy Inc. is a subsidiary of Shell that develops and operates wind farms and sells electricity. It was founded in 2001 and is based in Houston, Texas.

See also

Wind power industry
List of large wind farms
List of wind farms in the United States
Pickens Plan
Public Utility Commission of Texas
Renewable energy in the United States
Texas Interconnection
Wind farm
Wind power in the United States

References

Companies based in Houston
Energy companies established in 2001
Shell plc
Wind power in the United States
Wind power companies
2001 establishments in Texas